is a town located in Kamimashiki District, Kumamoto Prefecture, Japan. As of March 2017, the town has an estimated population of 33,001 and a density of 500 persons per km². The total area is 65.67 km².

Kumamoto Airport is located in Mashiki.

Mashiki was near the epicenter of the 2016 Kumamoto earthquake, leading to fire and rubble killing at least 40 people.

Geography

Climate

Notable People from Mashiki
Minoru Hata, football player
Shuhei Kamimura, football player
Taishin Morikawa, football player
Hiroki Noda, football player
Ryota Sakata, football player
Shintaro Shimada, football player

References

External links

Mashiki official website 

Towns in Kumamoto Prefecture